The DNB Extension for Education and Research is housed in the Department of Dance at The Ohio State University in Columbus, Ohio.  The DNB Extension was founded in the Department of Dance in 1968 as a way to further the work and library resources of the Dance Notation Bureau in New York, and to facilitate education and research in Labanotation, dance documentation, and dance preservation.

Ohio State University
Dance research
1968 establishments in Ohio